Pavino Polje is a village in the municipality of Bijelo Polje, Montenegro.

Demographics
According to the 2003 census, the village had a population of 294 people.

According to the 2011 census, its population was 142.

References

Populated places in Bijelo Polje Municipality
Serb communities in Montenegro